Scarboro is an unincorporated community in Jenkins County, in the U.S. state of Georgia.

History
The community was named after Enos H. Scarborough, the town's promoter and early postmaster. A variant spelling was "Scarborough". A post office was in operation at Scarboro(ugh) from 1839 until it was discontinued in 1951.

The Georgia General Assembly incorporated Scarboro as a town in 1859. The town's municipal charter was repealed in 1995.

References

Former municipalities in Georgia (U.S. state)
Unincorporated communities in Georgia (U.S. state)
Unincorporated communities in Jenkins County, Georgia
Populated places disestablished in 1995